Ayer is a town in Middlesex County, Massachusetts, United States.  Originally part of Groton, it was incorporated February 14, 1871, and became a major commercial railroad junction. The town was home to Camp Stevens, a training camp for Massachusetts volunteers during the American Civil War. Later, Fort Devens was established by the federal government to train New England soldiers for World War I. Fort Devens is a major influence on the area, although it is considerably smaller than when it was first closed in the mid-1990s. The town's population was 8,479 at the 2020 census.

History

Native American history
Ayer was originally inhabited by the Nashaway, a Nipmuc people that inhabited the lands along the Nashua River and its tributaries. A small settlement was located along the banks of the Nonacoicus Brook, located in the western part of the town. According to the personal manuscripts of Justice Samuel Sewall, best known for his controversial role in the Salem witch trials, he was told sometime in 1698 by Hanah, wife of Sachem Ahaton of the Ponkapoag Massachusett tribe, that the name was actually Nunnacoquis (modern Wôpanâak Massachusett dialect Nunahkuqees ) and signified 'an Indian earthen pot' although literally refers to a 'small dry earthen pot.' The name was likely a reference to a series of small mounds along the banks of the Nonacoicus Brook.

Very little archaeological evidence has been found of settlement in the region, most likely lost to centuries of cultivation and development, although a handful of stone tools or evidence of habitation have been found along the shores of the Nashua River, Nonacoicus Brook, Sandy Pond and Long Pond as well as a rock shelter on Snake Hill.  Although some have been dated to the Early Woodland Period (3000-2000 BP), the majority of findings are from the Late Woodland and Early Contact Period (1000-450 BP). In addition, portions of Main Street and Sandy Pond Road are believed to follow the vast network of trails used by Native peoples for trade, travel and communication.  The Nashaway likely cultivated corn, beans and squash, but depended on foraging for fruits, nuts, tubers and seeds to supplement their diets. Seasonally, camps were set up in hunting areas, but the most important gatherings were likely the annual spawning migrations of Atlantic salmon, alewife, American shad, blueback herring and sea lamprey that once swam up the Nashua River from the sea via the Merrimack River.

The arrival of English settlers in the seventeenth century was a great disruption. Virgin soil epidemics such as smallpox, leptospirosis, influenza, scarlet fever and measles ravaged Native communities due to their lack of immunity to Old World diseases. The influx of English settlers also led to competition for land and resources and efforts to subjugate and assimilate the Native peoples. The Nashaway were visited by the missionary John Eliot, who had translated the Bible into the Massachusett language, understood throughout New England as a second language. He began teaching Indians to read and write, and to train as missionaries and teachers. Land was set aside for the Indians for the Praying town of Nashoba in what is now neighboring Littleton, Massachusetts, which likely attracted many of the Nashaway families in the surrounding areas. Nashoba was one of fourteen communities in the colony established for the Indian converts, where they came to meld English and traditional ways.

By 1675, the peace between the English settlers and the Native Americans was broken with the uprising of the Wampanoag sachem Metacomet.  The Praying Indians, the inhabitants of the Praying towns such as Nashoba, were rounded up by English colonial militias and sent to Deer Island, where most froze or starved to death. Although heavy losses were inflicted on both sides, the English won and executed a vast number of Indians or sold them into slavery in the West Indies. Many left the region and chose to seek safety with the Abenaki and the French colonists in what is now Canada. Nashoba remained in Indian hands until 1736. The Native Americans began to congregate into a smaller number of communities. Three state-recognized tribes of Nipmuc, descended from the remnant communities that survived the epidemics and King Philip's War, include the Chaubunagungamaug Nipmuck of Webster, Massachusetts, the Hassanamisco Nipmuc of Grafton, Massachusetts and the Natick Massachusett-Nipmuc, a Massachusett people of partial Nipmuc ancestry.

Founding

The town of Groton, which originally included Ayer as well as several other towns in the region, was settled by English colonists as early as 1655. The first settlement in the portion of Groton that would become Ayer was in 1667, when a mill was constructed to serve a small hamlet that had developed around the Nonacoicus Brook.

The community eventually came to be known as South Groton, or with the arrival of the railroad, Groton Junction. This area was later partitioned and incorporated as the town of Ayer in 1871. The town was named Ayer in honor of Dr. James Cook Ayer, a prominent resident of Lowell, Massachusetts and one of the wealthiest pharmaceutical manufacturers of his day. Dr. Ayer provided the funding for the construction of the Town Hall.

Regional rail hub
The town's growth was influenced by a period of rapid development of railroad transportation. Though only  in area, the town became a major junction for both east–west and north–south rail lines, and developed into an important commercial center oriented towards the rail industry. Known as Groton Junction and later Ayer Junction, the intersecting railroads included:

 Fitchburg Railroad in 1844 to Boston and eventually points in New York State (still in operation in 2021 as District 3 (Pan Am Southern) and the MBTA Fitchburg Line To Wachusetts).
 Peterborough and Shirley Railroad in 1848 (became part of the Fitchburg Railroad and later the Boston & Maine Railroad. Its northerly terminus was Greenville, New Hampshire. In 2021 active rail on what is now known as the Greenville Industrial Track serves two customers on line, both located one mile north of Ayer center. Operational rail ceases at a derelict trestle spanning the Nashua River on the Ayer/Groton border. Tracks are intact to Townsend, Massachusetts.
 Worcester and Nashua Railroad in 1848 (Southern branch still in operation under Pan Am Southern to Worcester to connect with CSX Transportation. Northern end of the branch from Ayer to Nashua, NH abandoned in 1981. The Nashua River Rail Trail has occupied the old right-of-way since 2005)
 Stony Brook Railroad to North Chelmsford, Massachusetts, in 1848 (still in operation in 2021 as District 2 [Pan Am Railways])

The split between the Stony Brook and Fitchburg main line was moved east from the central junction to reduce parallel trackage.

Military roles
During the Civil War an army training camp, Camp Stevens, was located near the Nashua River. Camp Devens, which eventually became Fort Devens, was established in 1917, during World War I. The presence of thousands of military and civilian personnel on the base shifted Ayer's commercial development towards meeting their needs until Fort Devens was closed in 1996, but was reopened the next day as a reserve training area. It has since been reopened, although on a much smaller scale than the days when it was active.

Ski jump
In 1935, the largest Nordic ski jump in North America was constructed at Pingry Hill near the Willows. A 700-foot-high wooden trestle build, the ski jump operated for a single winter season amid the hardships of Great Depression-era Ayer. Part of the structure was blown down by the wind in the summer of 1936 and it was never rebuilt. Some of the lumber was salvaged by local residents over the next few years. As of 2013, no trace of the massive structure remains.

Modern day
Within its relatively small area Ayer boasts numerous industries, including plants belonging to Cains (no longer in business since August 2017), Vitasoy and Pepsi, a historical downtown unique to the region, and modern commuter rail service to Boston.

The Hollywood film Conviction depicted the legal drama surrounding the investigation, conviction and eventual exoneration of Kenneth "Kenny" Waters, for the 1980 murder of Katharina Brow.  Waters' sister Betty Anne worked with the Innocence Project, a nonprofit organization devoted to overturning the wrongful convictions using DNA test results as evidence. In 2009 the town and its insurers eventually paid a $3.4 million settlement in response to a civil rights lawsuit by the estate of Kenneth Waters.

Geography

According to the United States Census Bureau, the town has a total area of 9.6 square miles (24.8 km2), of which 9.0 square miles (23.4 km2) is land and 0.6 square mile (1.4 km2) (5.75%) is water.

Ayer borders the towns of Shirley, Groton, Littleton, and Harvard.

Demographics

At the 2010 census, there were 7,427 people, 3,118 households and 1,831 families residing in the town. The racial makeup of the town was 84.3% White, 5.9% African American, 0.3% Native American, 3.6% Asian, 2.3% from other races, and 3.4% from two or more races. Hispanic or Latino of any race were 5.7% of the population.

There were 3,063 households, of which 26.5% had children under the age of 18 living with them, 46.0% were married couples living together, 2.8% had a male householder with no wife present, 11.9% had a female householder with no husband present, and 39.3% were non-families. 32.4% of all households were made up of individuals, and 10.7% had someone living alone who was 65 years of age or older. The average household size was 2.26 and the average family size was 2.86.

Of the 7,427 people in the population, 22.6% were under the age of 18, 7.5% were 15 to 19 years of age, 6.7% were 20 to 24 years of age, 28.1% were 25 to 44 years of age, 28.1% were 45 to 64 years of age, and 11.4% were 65 years and over. The median age was 38.2 years. For every 100 females, there were 101.2 males. For every 100 females 18 years and over there were 97.9 males.
 
The median household income was $54,899, and the median family income was $78,947. The median income of individuals working full-time was $53,194, for males versus $47,198 for females. The per capita income for the town was $32,179. About 8.0% of families and 12.8% of the population were below the poverty line, including 12.5% of those under age 18 and 9.9% of those age 65 or over.

Government
As a New England town, Ayer is governed by town meeting and a three-member board of selectmen.

Economy

Former head office for North America operations for Vitasoy (2016 to 2018) and now as US regional office.

Education

Public schools
Along with the neighboring town of Shirley, Ayer is served by the Ayer Shirley Regional School District.
 Page Hilltop Elementary School
 Ayer Shirley Regional Middle School
 Ayer Shirley Regional High School

Additionally, Ayer is home to the Francis W. Parker Charter Essential School.

Transportation
The Montachusett Regional Transit Authority (MART) serves the town of Ayer. The MBTA Commuter Rail's Fitchburg Line provides service to and from North Station in Boston at Ayer station.

Ayer is located on routes 2A, 110, and 111; it is one town away from both Interstate 495 and Route 2.

Freight trains travel daily through Ayer over the tracks of the historic Stony Brook Railroad. The line currently serves as a major corridor of Pan Am Railway's District 3 which connects New Hampshire and Maine with western Massachusetts, Vermont, and New York.

The southern segment of the Nashua River Rail Trail commences in Ayer.

Points of interest

Places on the National Register of Historic Places:
 Community Memorial Hospital – 15 Winthrop Ave.
 Fort Devens Historic District
 Ayer Main Street Historic District – Main St.
 Pleasant Street School – Pleasant St.
 St. Andrew's Church (1892) – 7 Faulkner St.

The Billiards Cafe on Ayer's Main Street is notable as the home of the only full-sized (6 ft by 12 ft) snooker table in New England.

Notable people

 Lee Alexander, bassist
 Bill Aucoin, band manager of Kiss from 1973 to 1982
 Foster Ellenborough Lascelles Beal, naturalist
 C. L. Blood, con artist
 Rita Briggs, an American female baseball catcher who played from 1947 through 1954 for seven different teams in the All-American Girls Professional Baseball League
 Angus Dun, vicar at St. Andrew's Episcopal Church
 Robert Frazier, writer of speculative poetry and fiction
 Mike Gillian, Longwood University head men's basketball coach
 Jamie Morris, National Football League running back
 Joe Morris, National Football League running back
 Betty Anne Waters, a lawyer who was able to exonerate her brother and featured in the 2010 film Conviction
 Norbert Wiener, a child prodigy who graduated from Ayer High School at age 11 and became a pioneering electronics engineer and theorist of computers and cybernetics

References

External links

 Town of Ayer official website
 Ayer Public School District
 The Ayer Public Spirit Newspaper

 
Towns in Middlesex County, Massachusetts
Populated places established in 1667
1667 establishments in Massachusetts
Towns in Massachusetts